Magic Cop, also informally known as Mr. Vampire 5, is a 1990 Hong Kong horror comedy film produced by, and starring, Lam Ching-ying. It was released in Hong Kong on 11 February 1990, and in the Philippines on 18 June 1992.

Plot
Uncle Feng, an experienced policeman, lives a quiet and beautiful life in Tung Ping Chau. One day, the old lady living next door comes to ask him to go to Hong Kong Island to return the body of her daughter, a stewardess killed by the police after being suspected of being a drug smuggler. Feng finds that the "stewardess" had actually been killed before her return to Hong Kong. She had been turned into a "living corpse", and is being controlled by a Japanese magician for smuggling. With Feng's supernatural skills and detective techniques, they finally find the location of the secret altar of the Japanese magician.

Cast
Lam Ching-ying as Uncle Feng
Wilson Lam as Detective Lam
Michael Miu as Sergeant No. 2237
Wong Mei-way as Lin
Michiko Nishiwaki as Japanese magician
Wu Ma as Ma
Billy Chow as Japanese magician's henchman
Frankie Chin as Eddie

Release
Magic Cop was released in Hong Kong on 11 February 1990. In the Philippines, the film was released with the same name on 18 June 1992; Lam Ching-ying is credited as Michael Lee.

Critical reception
LoveHKFilm remarked, "The action scenes are fun (as one would expect from Stephen Tung), and the cultural connections are cool-as-can-be."

Home media

VCD releases

DVD releases

References

External links

HK cinemagic entry

1990 films
1990 action comedy films
1990 martial arts films
1990s comedy horror films
1990s Cantonese-language films
Films set in Hong Kong
Films shot in Hong Kong
Hong Kong action comedy films
Hong Kong martial arts comedy films
Hong Kong supernatural horror films
Jiangshi films
Martial arts horror films
Police detective films
Vampire comedy films
1990s Hong Kong films